"Think It Over" is a song by American rock band the Cars from their fourth studio album, Shake It Up (1981). It was written by Ric Ocasek.

Release
"Think It Over" first saw release on the 1981 album Shake It Up, but following the release of the album, the song was released as a single in the United Kingdom and Australia. Backed with "I'm Not the One" (which later became successful in its own right), the single did not make a dent in the charts. The single was not released in the United States, as the track "Victim of Love" (also from Shake It Up) received a single release instead.

Reception
AllMusic critic Greg Prato cited the track as a highlight from Shake It Up, and described the track as "almost entirely synth-oriented" and called it one of the "many lesser-known album tracks [on Shake It Up that] prove[d] to be [a] highlight".  Boston Globe critic Steve Morse praised "Think It Over" as a high point of Shake It Up and an exception from the "absence of spirit" of the album. Morse called "Think It Over" a "great dance tune," saying that "it seems to borrow heavily from Roy Hamilton's 1958 hit, 'Don't Let Go'".

References

1981 songs
1982 singles
The Cars songs
Songs written by Ric Ocasek
Song recordings produced by Roy Thomas Baker
Elektra Records singles